Fiorello Gramillano (born 1 February 1946) is an Italian politician.

He is a member of the Democratic Party. Gramillano was elected mayor of Ancona at the 2009 Italian local elections, supported by a centr-left coalition, and took office on 23 June 2009. He served until 17 January 2013.

References

External links
 

1945 births
Living people
Mayors of Ancona
Democratic Party (Italy) politicians